Alessandro Tonolli (born June 25, 1974) is an Italian professional basketball player for Virtus Roma of the Italian League. At 202 cm, he plays the power forward and center positions.

References

1974 births
Living people
Centers (basketball)
Italian men's basketball players
Pallacanestro Virtus Roma players
Sportspeople from Verona
Power forwards (basketball)